Blue Ridge is an American crime drama film, originally released in 2020. The film stars Johnathon Schaech, Sarah Lancaster and Ben Esler.

A number of scenes from the film were shot on location in Rabun County, Georgia. Blue Ridge was initially released on the INSP TV network. The film then was released on streaming platform Vudu.

Plot
The film stars Johnathon Schaech, who takes up the role of Sheriff Justin Wise. of a small mountain town. He moves to the town to be nearer his ex-wife Elli, played by Sarah Lancaster and his young daughter. The sleepy, small-town atmosphere is quickly disrupted after a high-profile murder takes place. Personal grievances interfere with the case in the Blue Ridge Mountains. Justin Wise and his deputies set out to solve the murder and keep the mountain community from falling into a long-held family feud.

Cast
 Johnathon Schaech as Justin Wise
 Sarah Lancaster as Elli Wise
 Lara Silva as Deputy Becky Dobson
 Ben Esler as Deputy Thompson
 Taegen Burns as Maddie Wise
 Tom Proctor as Jeremiah Wade
 Graham Greene as Cliff McGrath
 Kevin L. Johnson as Lem Keagen

References

 INSP Films